No Entry Pudhe Dhoka Aahe is a 2012 Indian Marathi comedy film released on 7 September 2012. The film was directed by Ankush Choudhary and produced by Prem Rajagopalan and Nikhil Saini. The film stars Ankush Choudhary, Bharat Jadhav, Aniket Vishwasrao, Kranti Redkar, Manwa Naik, Sai Lokur, Paddy Kambli and Sai Tamhankar. It is a remake of 2002 Tamil film Charlie Chaplin.

Plot
No Entry Pudhe Dhoka Aahe opens its doors to reveal the lives of three men. Krishna 'the married man'. Sunny ' the bachelor' and Prem,' the married bachelor'. Ironically, while the faithful Krishna has a very suspicious Kaajal as his wife, playboy Prem has a trusting wife Pooja. And there is Sunny's-to-be wife Sanjana, who is a bit of both.

Trouble brews when Prem decides to make Krishna taste the forbidden fruit that he loves so much. This forbidden fruit assumes the form of sultry Bobby, who walks through the board right into the lives of them all, leading to chaos, craziness, commotion and crisis.

Cast
 Ankush Choudhary as Prem
 Bharat Jadhav as Kishan
 Aniket Vishwasrao as Sunny
 Sai Lokur as Pooja
 Kranti Redkar as Kaajal
 Manava Naik as Sanjana
 Sai Tamhankar as Bobby

Soundtrack
 Zapun Zapun - Sunidhi Chauhan, Anu Malik
 Gokulamadhe - Sonu Nigam

References

External links
 

2012 films
Indian comedy films
2010s Marathi-language films
Marathi remakes of Tamil films
2012 comedy films